Paulina F. Kernberg (January 10, 1935 – April 12, 2006) was a Chilean American child psychiatrist, an authority on personality disorders, and a professor at Cornell University.

Early life 

Kernberg was born in Santiago, Chile. She was married to Otto F. Kernberg, a professor of psychiatry at Cornell University. She earned a Bachelor of Science and Doctor of Medicine from the University of Chile.

Career 
After earning her medical degree, Kernberg moved to Topeka, Kansas, where she trained in psychiatry at the C.F. Menninger Memorial Hospital. She became a U.S. citizen in 1968 and joined the Topeka Institute for Psychoanalysis in 1969.

Kernberg's work included studies on the emotional effects of divorce, where she noted the trauma from divorce was second only to a parent's death in the perception of children involved. Following this work, she helped found a clinical program for children of divorced families at the NewYork-Presbyterian Hospital. She was the director of the Residency Program in Child and Adolescent Psychiatry at the New York Presbyterian Hospital, Payne Whitney Westchester-Weill Cornell Medical Center since 1978, until her death. She was a teacher at the Columbia University Center for Psychoanalytic Training and Research, where she was a supervising and training analyst in Psychoanalysis and Child Psychoanalysis. She authored over 100 articles and chapters in child psychiatry and psychoanalysis, and presented internationally and in multiple languages. 

Kernberg was noted for her work evaluating Elián González, the six-year-old Cuban boy at the center of an international custody battle in 2000 in what quickly became an inflammatory issue among Cuban-Americans and in the United States Congress. She described and proved that children show specific patterns of behavior in the playroom and repeat certain play themes according to their diagnosis. She also developed a questionnaire that the child psychiatrist uses during an assessment interview to measure the level of personality integration in adolescents, depending on their capacity to relate to peers and friends. She developed a standardized interview that is done to the mother and child when they are in front of a mirror, and also developed a similar instrument to assess the personality integration of adolescents. Kernberg was the first who described and studied with statistical analysis the early signs of personality disorders, which she said were already present and treatable in children and adolescents.

Personal life 
She died of cancer in New York City at age 71.

See also 

 Dynamite, a children's magazine to which Kernberg contributed an advice column

References

External links 

 Video of Dr. Peter Wilson's interview of Paulina Kernberg for the History of the Department of Psychiatry at New York-Presbyterian Hospital

1935 births
2006 deaths
American psychoanalysts
Chilean emigrants to the United States
Cornell University faculty
Naturalized citizens of the United States